Waltraud Weißenberg (born 30 December 1943) is a German sports shooter. She competed in the women's 25 metre pistol event at the 1984 Summer Olympics.

References

External links
 

1943 births
Living people
German female sport shooters
Olympic shooters of West Germany
Shooters at the 1984 Summer Olympics
People from Heilbronn (district)
Sportspeople from Stuttgart (region)